Fissidens taxifolius is a species of moss in the Fissidentaceae family. It has a cosmopolitan distribution.

Fissidens taxifolius is known to be able to use artificial light to grow in places which are otherwise devoid of natural light, such as Crystal Cave in Wisconsin.

References 

Dicranales